Hassiba Boulmerka (born 10 July 1968) is a former Algerian middle distance athlete.

Career
Born in Constantine, Boulmerka started running seriously at the age of ten, specializing in the 800 and 1500 metres. She was successful in national and regional races, although there wasn't much competition. Her first major international tournament was the 1988 Summer Olympics in Seoul, where she was eliminated in the preliminary heat of both the 800 and 1500 m.

Boulmerka's performances slowly became better, and her big breakthrough came in 1991. The first major race she won was the 800 m. at the Golden Gala race in Rome, Italy. A month later, she competed at the World Championships. On the last straight of the 1500 m final, she sprinted to victory, becoming the first African woman to win an athletics world title.

Her remarkable performance did not only give her positive attention. She was frequently criticized by Muslim groups in Algeria who thought she showed too much of her body when racing. Boulmerka received death threats and was forced to move to Europe to train. In spite of this, she was one of the favorites for the 1500 m gold medal at the 1992 Barcelona Olympics. In the final, she fought off Lyudmila Rogachova and Qu Yunxia (world record holder until 2015) for the gold medal. It was Algeria's first gold medal at the Olympic Games.

Boulmerka's next two seasons were not as successful, although she won a bronze medal at the 1993 World Championships in Stuttgart. In 1995, she hadn't won a single race going into the World Championships in Gothenburg, but this did not prevent her from winning her second world title. It was her only victory of that season, and her last major victory. She competed at the Centennial Olympics in Atlanta, but sprained her ankle in the semi-finals. After the 1997 season, in which she did not defend her world title, she retired from sports.

Boulmerka was later elected to the Athletes' Commission of the International Olympic Committee.

She formerly held the 1500 metres African record with her time of 3:55.30 run on 8 August 1992 in Barcelona. She also held the one mile African record of 4:20.79, set in 1991 in Oslo, for 17 years until it was beaten by Gelete Burika of Ethiopia, who timed 4:18.23 in 2008.

Post-athletics career
Boulmerka has returned to Algeria and is now a businesswoman.
 best Algerian athletes of the last 50 years 2013

References

External links
 
 

1968 births
Living people
Algerian female middle-distance runners
Athletes (track and field) at the 1988 Summer Olympics
Athletes (track and field) at the 1992 Summer Olympics
Athletes (track and field) at the 1996 Summer Olympics
Olympic athletes of Algeria
Olympic gold medalists for Algeria
Sportspeople from Constantine, Algeria
World Athletics Championships medalists
Medalists at the 1992 Summer Olympics
Olympic gold medalists in athletics (track and field)
Mediterranean Games gold medalists for Algeria
Mediterranean Games silver medalists for Algeria
Athletes (track and field) at the 1991 Mediterranean Games
Athletes (track and field) at the 1993 Mediterranean Games
Mediterranean Games medalists in athletics
World Athletics Championships winners
21st-century Algerian women
20th-century Algerian women